The tunica albuginea is a layer of condensed fibrous tissue on the surface of the ovary.

Structure 
The tunica albuginea is composed of short connective tissue fibers. It is located immediately inside the surface epithelium (previously known as germinal epithelium) which is continuous with the peritoneum. It is non-vascularised. It is thinner than the tunica albuginea of the testis, and its thickness varies across the ovary.

Development 
The tunica albuginea is formed late in prenatal development. It buds off from mesonephric stroma.

References

External links
 

Mammal female reproductive system